Sikupilli (Estonian for "Billy Instrument", in reference to Torupilli) is a subdistrict in the district of Lasnamäe, Tallinn, the capital of Estonia. It has a population of 11,298.

Gallery

References

Subdistricts of Tallinn